John James "Jean" Charest  (born June 24, 1958) is a Canadian lawyer and former politician who served as the 29th premier of Quebec from 2003 to 2012 and the fifth deputy prime minister of Canada in 1993. Charest was elected to the House of Commons in 1984 and would serve in several federal cabinet positions between 1986 and 1993. He became the leader of the Progressive Conservative (PC) Party in 1993 and remained in the role until he entered provincial politics in 1998. Charest was elected as the leader of the Quebec Liberal Party, and his party went on to form government in 2003.

Born in Sherbrooke, Quebec, Charest studied law and worked as a lawyer before he became a member of Parliament (MP) following the 1984 federal election. In 1986 he joined Brian Mulroney's government as a minister of state, but resigned from cabinet in 1990 after improperly speaking to a judge about an active court case. He returned to cabinet in 1991 as the minister of the environment. Kim Campbell won the PC leadership election in 1993 and became prime minister and Charest was appointed industry minister and deputy prime minister. The PCs lost the 1993 federal election and Campbell resigned as leader. Charest was named interim PC leader before he was acclaimed as the permanent leader in 1995. He left federal politics in 1998 and was elected to lead the Quebec Liberals, the province's main federalist political party. His party won the 2003 provincial election and Charest became premier of Quebec, winning two more elections until he lost the 2012 election to the sovereigntist Parti Quebecois (PQ) and resigned as premier. After politics, Charest worked as a consultant, including for Huawei on the Meng Wanzhou case and for its 5G network plans in Canada, and joined McCarthy Tétrault LLP as a partner. Charest was a candidate in the 2022 Conservative Party of Canada leadership election.

Early life and education
Charest was born on June 24, 1958, in Sherbrooke, in Quebec's Eastern Townships. His parents are Rita, an Irish Quebecer, and Claude "Red" Charest, a French Canadian. He obtained a law degree from the Université de Sherbrooke and was admitted to the Barreau du Québec in 1981. He is married to Michèle Dionne (since June 21, 1980), and they have three children, Amélie, Antoine, and Alexandra.

Charest is fully bilingual in French and English. In the 1980 Quebec referendum, he failed to vote because he was getting married.

Federal politics
Charest worked as a lawyer until he was elected Progressive Conservative member of the Parliament of Canada for the riding (electoral district) of Sherbrooke in the 1984 election.  From 1984 to 1986, Charest served as Assistant Deputy Chair of Committees of the Whole of the House of Commons.

Ministries in the Mulroney government
In 1986, at age 28, Charest was appointed to the Cabinet of Prime Minister Brian Mulroney as minister of state (youth). He was the youngest cabinet minister in Canadian history.

Charest was appointed minister of state (fitness and amateur sport) in 1988, but had to resign from cabinet in 1990 after improperly speaking to a judge about a case regarding the Canadian Track and Field Association.

Charest returned to cabinet as minister of the environment in 1991.

Leadership bids and leadership of the PCs
When Mulroney announced his retirement as PC leader and prime minister, Charest was a candidate for the leadership of the party at the 1993 Progressive Conservative leadership convention.

Karlheinz Schreiber alleged he gave $30,000 in cash to Charest's campaign for the Tory leadership in 1993. However Charest himself says it was only $10,000 although federal leadership election rules permitted such cash donations. As of 2007, rules against such donations for provincial party leadership campaigns still do not exist in Québec.

Charest placed a strong second to Defence Minister Kim Campbell, who had held a large lead going into the convention. Charest served as Deputy Prime Minister and Minister of Industry, Science and Technology in Campbell's short-lived cabinet.

In the 1993 election, the PCs suffered the worst defeat for a governing party at the federal level. Only two of the party's 295 candidates were elected, Charest and Elsie Wayne. Charest himself was re-elected fairly handily in Sherbrooke, taking 56 percent of the vote. As the only surviving member of what turned out to be the last PC Cabinet, Charest was appointed interim party leader and confirmed in the post in April 1995. Charest, therefore, became the first person of francophone descent to lead the Progressive Conservative Party.

In the late 1980s and early 1990s, Charest was involved in the constitutional debate that resulted from Quebec's refusal to sign the Canadian Constitution of 1982. He was a special committee member charged with examining the Meech Lake Accord in 1990, which would have given the province of Quebec the status of a "distinct society". The accord ultimately failed.

Charest participated in the 1994 class of the World Economic Forum's Global Leaders for Tomorrow program.

During the 1995 referendum on Quebec's sovereignty, Charest was vice-president of the "No" campaign (Comité national des Québécoises et des Québécois pour le NON).

In the 1997 federal election, Charest campaigned in favour of Quebec's being constitutionally recognized as a distinct society. In the election, the Tories received 19 percent of the vote and won 20 seats, mostly in Atlantic Canada.  The party was back from the brink, but Charest considered the result a disappointment.  While the Tories finished only a point behind Reform, their support was too dispersed west of Quebec to translate into seats.  They were also hampered by vote-splitting with Reform in rural central Ontario, a traditional Tory stronghold where Reform had made significant inroads.

Return to federal politics
On March 9, 2022, Charest announced that he would be a candidate for the 2022 Conservative Party of Canada leadership election, finishing as the runner-up to elected leader Pierre Poilievre. He had previously considered running in the 2020 leadership election, though he ultimately elected not to.

Provincial politics
In April 1998, Charest gave in to considerable public and political pressure, especially among business circles, to leave federal politics and become leader of the Quebec Liberal Party. Charest was considered by many to be the best hope for the federalist QLP to defeat the sovereigntist Parti Québécois government.

In the 1998 election, the Quebec Liberals received more votes than the PQ, but because the Liberal vote was concentrated in fewer ridings, the PQ won enough seats to form another majority government. Charest won his own riding of Sherbrooke with a majority of 907 votes.

In the April 2003 election, Charest led the Quebec Liberals to a majority, ending nine years of PQ rule. He declared he had a mandate to reform health care, cut taxes, reduce spending and reduce the size of government. Charest's Liberals won 76 seats, forming a majority government, and won his own riding of Sherbrooke with a majority of 2597 votes.

Premier of Quebec

Economic policy
Charest's first two years as Premier of Quebec were marked by stiff and vocal opposition to his policies by Quebec labour unions.  Indeed, the Charest government consistently sought new sources of revenue, increasing hydro rates, raising auto insurance premiums, increasing fees for various government services, and imposing a carbon tax on businesses. They did, however, refrain from raising the Provincial Sales Tax to make up for the loss of revenue caused by the decision of the federal government to reduce the Goods and Services Tax to 5 per cent. They also continued the Parti Québécois drive to provide subsidies and tax breaks for families with children.

Much of the fiscal policy of the Charest government was based upon the expectation that new revenues could be obtained from a resolution of the fiscal imbalance believed to exist between the federal and provincial governments. The Harper government was widely expected to address this issue through increased equalization payments, while falling short of Quebec's overall demands.

Environmental policy

Charest also attempted to distinguish himself on the issue of the environment. His vocal opposition to the federal decision to opt out of the Kyoto Accord, and his insistence that Quebec would seek to meet its own Kyoto targets has earned him considerable support. His government set ambitious greenhouse gas reduction targets, petroleum royalties, and a 2011-2020 Action Plan for Electric Vehicles. He also established the Sustainable Development Act, which adds to the Charter of Rights and Freedoms the right for every person to live in a healthful environment in which biodiversity is preserved. On May 9, 2011, Charest launched the Plan Nord, the work of a generation that brings together the imperatives of environmental, social and economic growth and sustainability. In 2012, Charest was awarded the Fray International Sustainability Award for his work and advocacy towards sustainable development in politics.

Other domestic policy

In the 2003 election, Charest had promised to allow the cities that had been forcibly merged by the Parti Québécois government to hold referendums which would allow to demerge and return to their previous situation. This promise was seen as key to his victory in many ridings, such as those in the suburbs around Longueuil and Quebec City and the continued support of the Anglophone community in the West Island of Montreal. In office, however, Charest retreated from his promise. Municipalities were allowed to hold demerger referendums if at least 10 percent of the electorate signed a petition calling for them, and only if more than 35 percent participated in the voting process. In some former municipalities, such as Saint Laurent on the Island of Montreal, the turnout of the vote was of 75.2 percent in favour of a demerger, but it was invalidated because the voter turnout was just 28.6 percent.

The demerger process also resulted in the restructuring of the existing megacities, with both these and the demerged cities handing over massive powers over taxation and local services to the new "agglomeration councils". The makeup of these councils was based on the population of the municipalities involved, with the mayors having the right to unilaterally appoint all of the individuals who would represent their cities on the council. The resulting structure was seen by many to be less democratic than the one which had preceded it, as demerged municipalities were denied an effective voice, and the city councils of the major cities were substantially weakened by the power of the mayors to go over the heads of opposition councillors and exercise power through their appointees to the agglomeration body.

During his mandate as Premier, Charest made some efforts to expand the place of Québec in the international community. The province was granted representation at UNESCO, the cultural branch of the United Nations. Charest also voiced some support for the Calgary Declaration (1997), which recognized Quebec as "unique."

During the debate in the Parliament of Canada over recognizing Quebec as a nation within Canada, Charest stated that Quebec was a "nation" no matter what other parts of Canada said—that this was not up to anyone else to define.

Controversies

There was significant tension between himself and members of the party with the resignations of several important members of his cabinet, notably Finance Minister Yves Séguin, Justice Minister Marc Bellemare, and Environment Minister Thomas Mulcair.

On December 6, 2007, the Opposition urged Charest to testify to the House of Commons of Canada Ethics Committee in its investigation of Karlheinz Schreiber. Schreiber told the committee he paid $30,000 in cash to Charest's brother to help fund the current Prime Minister's 1993 leadership bid for the federal Progressive Conservative party.

2012 student protests

In 2011, the Charest government decided to increase the tuition fees in all Quebec universities. Three major student unions began to organise demonstrations in Montreal and in Quebec City. In March 2012, many CEGEPs and universities voted for a student strike. The government faced major challenges when students demonstrated and went on strike by boycotting classes to protest planned tuition increases.  Every month large demonstrations took place in several cities across Quebec. The Premier and his government were accused by some, including the students unions, the PQ and Québec Solidaire of being too hard. On May 4, 2012, the Quebec Liberal Party held a party conference in Victoriaville and a student demonstration was suppressed by Sûreté du Québec police. On May 14, 2012, then Deputy Premier and Education minister, Line Beauchamp resigned and Michelle Courchesne was appointed Deputy Premier and Minister of Education. The government passed Bill 78 to impose restrictions on protests; this caused controversy, with the Barreau du Québec, among others, expressing concern about possible infringement of constitutional rights.  Bill 78 was revoked by the Pauline Marois government.

2007 Quebec election

The Charest government was deeply unpopular during its first years in office, enjoying a public approval rating of below 50 per cent in most opinion polls and falling to the low twenties in voter support. In the first few weeks after André Boisclair was elected leader of the PQ, polls showed that Charest and the Liberals would be roundly defeated in the next election.  Boisclair did not perform well as Leader of the Opposition, and Charest's numbers recovered somewhat.  A poll conducted by Léger Marketing for Le Devoir placed the Liberals at 34 per cent against 32 per cent for the PQ and 24 per cent for the ADQ, with Charest obtaining a higher personal approval rating than the PQ leader. Liberal support, however remained heavily concentrated in Anglophone and Allophone ridings in the west of Montreal, meaning that the increase in support would not necessarily translate into seats.

On February 21, 2007, Charest asked the Lieutenant-Governor to dissolve the National Assembly and call an election on March 26, 2007. Charest conducted an extraordinary session the day before with Finance Minister Michel Audet delivering the 2007 budget.

Prior to his call for an election, Charest revealed his platform which included income tax cuts of about $250 million. In the last week of the campaign, Charest promised an additional $700 million in tax cuts—some of it coming for the additional equalization money from the 2007 federal budget; reduction of hospital wait times; improvement and increase of French courses at school; an increase of the number of daycare spaces; and an increase in tuition fees for university students ($50 per semester until 2012). The last measure was met with criticism from students' associations, and a more-radical student association, the Association pour une solidarité syndicale étudiante (formerly known as the CASSEE) had also considered a strike.

Charest won a minority government in the election, and held onto his own seat. On election night, early numbers had shown Charest losing his seat of Sherbrooke to his PQ opponent; however, this situation was reversed once it became apparent that the advanced poll ballot boxes which heavily favoured Charest had not yet been counted. The resulting minority government was the first since 1878 when Charles Boucher de Boucherville was Premier.

2008 Quebec election

In November 2008, arguing that Quebecers needed a majority government during difficult economic times, Charest called a snap election for December 8. His party captured  a historic third consecutive term as he brought the Liberals back to majority governance.  It was the first time a party had won a third consecutive term in Quebec since the Quiet Revolution.

2012 Quebec election
On August 1, 2012, Charest launched his electoral campaign for the 2012 Quebec general election from the Quebec Jean-Lesage International Airport with the slogan For Quebec. The QLP focused its campaign on the issues of respect of the law and civil order, referencing the demonstrations of the previous months. They claimed to be the party of the silent majority who did not support the student protest movement. It was the first provincial election in Quebec to feature the newly formed CAQ party led by François Legault on the ballot. On the night of September 4, Charest and his party lost the general election. The result was a hung parliament, with the Parti Québécois of Pauline Marois being the party with the most seats (54). The Quebec Liberal Party became the official opposition with 50 seats. Charest lost his own seat of Sherbrooke in the Eastern Townships, a seat that he had held since 1984, both in the federal and provincial legislatures. Charest announced on September 5 in Quebec City that he would resign as Quebec Liberal Party leader.

Outside of politics
Charest was formerly a consultant for Huawei and helped support and advise Huawei for its participation for 5G network plans in Canada and to be a partner with McCarthy Tétrault LLP. Charest also claims he helped with the Meng Wanzhou case.

Electoral record

Leaderships

Provincial

|}

|}

Federal

Honours

125th Anniversary of the Confederation of Canada Medal (1992)
Queen Elizabeth II Golden Jubilee Medal (2002)
Bavarian Order of Merit (2007)
Commander of France's Legion of Honour (February 2, 2009)

See also

 List of premiers of Quebec
 Politics of Canada
 Politics of Quebec

References

External links

 

1958 births
Anglophone Quebec people
Canadian people of French descent
Canadian people of Irish descent
Deputy Prime Ministers of Canada
French Quebecers
Quebec people of Irish descent
Lawyers in Quebec
Living people
Members of the House of Commons of Canada from Quebec
Members of the King's Privy Council for Canada
People from Westmount, Quebec
Politicians from Sherbrooke
Premiers of Quebec
Progressive Conservative Party of Canada MPs
Quebecers of French descent
Quebec Liberal Party MNAs
Quebec political party leaders
Université de Sherbrooke alumni
Commandeurs of the Légion d'honneur
Members of the 24th Canadian Ministry
Members of the 25th Canadian Ministry
21st-century Canadian politicians